Pac-Man All-Stars is a video game for Microsoft Windows developed by British studio Creature Labs and published by Infogrames in 2002. It is a multiplayer video game where players control their characters to run around in different arenas to collect the most dots.

Reception

References

2002 video games
Multiplayer video games
North America-exclusive video games
Pac-Man
Party video games
Video games developed in the United Kingdom
Windows games
Windows-only games